Senate elections were held in Turkey on 14 October 1979, with one-third of the 150 seats elected. They were the last elections to the Senate, which was abolished in 1982.

Results

References

Turkey
Turkey
Senate
Senate elections in Turkey